King's Gate may refer to:

 Gate of the King (Madagascar) in Mahajanga
 King's Gate (Aachen)
 King's Gate (Berlin)
 King's Gate (Kaliningrad)
 King's Gate (Kassel)
 King's Gate (Minden)
 King's Gate (Nuremberg)
 King's Gate aka Kuninkaanportti in Helsinki
 Gate of All Nations in the ruins of Persepolis, Iran
 King's gate, a firearm loading mechanism designed by Nelson King for the Winchester Model 1866

See also
 Kingsgate (disambiguation)